Kirrberg (in dialect Kerrbrich) is a district of Homburg, situated in the eastern part of the Saarpfalz (Saar-Palatinate) district and the Saarland bordering state Rhineland-Palatinate. Until End 1973 was Kirrberg an independent municipality in the former Homburg district. Homburg (5 km), Zweibrücken (7 km), Saarbrücken and Kaiserslautern (both 35 km) are the closest towns.
As of 1 August 2021, 2,607 inhabitants live in Kirrberg.

The river Lambsbach runs through the district from east to west.

History 
The chapel of Kirrberg was firstly mentioned in the year 1290 as "Capella in Kirchperch".
On 23 April 1949 Kirrberg was affiliated to the Bundesland Saarland and because of that it is the youngest village of the Bundesland.

References

External links 
Webpage of Kirrberg

Geography of Saarland
Former municipalities in Saarland